Cava Winery & Vineyard is a winery in Hardyston Township (mailing address is Hamburg) in Sussex County, New Jersey. The vineyard was first planted in 2005, and opened to the public in 2008. Cava has 5 acres of grapes under cultivation, and produces 3000 cases of wine per year. The winery is named for the Italian word cava which means "cave," reflecting the mining heritage of Sussex County.

Wines
Cava Winery produces wine from Cabernet Franc, Cabernet Sauvignon, Ciliegiolo, Chardonnay, Durif (Petite Sirah), Grechetto, Merlot, Muscat blanc, Pinot gris, Pinot noir, Riesling, Sagrantino, Sangiovese, Sauvignon blanc, Trebbiano, and Zinfandel grapes. Cava also makes fruit wines from açaí berries, apples, blackberries, blueberries, kiwifruit, peaches, pears, pomegranates, raspberries, strawberries, and watermelons. It is the only winery in New Jersey that produces wine from Ciliegiolo, Grechetto, and Sagrantino, which are vinifera grapes indigenous to the Umbria region of Italy. Cava is also the only New Jersey winery that uses açaí berries, pears, and watermelons. The winery has a separate brand for their fruit wines, named "Ceci Bella" after the owner's dog. Cava is not located in one of New Jersey's three viticultural areas.

Features, licensing, associations, and publicity
The winery operates a bistro that sells appetizers and pizzas. Cava has a plenary winery license from the New Jersey Division of Alcoholic Beverage Control, which allows it to produce an unrestricted amount of wine, operate up to 15 off-premises sales rooms, and ship up to 12 cases per year to consumers in-state or out-of-state. The winery is a member of the Garden State Wine Growers Association and its subsidiary, Vintage North Jersey. In July 2012, Cava was profiled on the television show Road Trip with G. Garvin.

See also
Alcohol laws of New Jersey
American wine
Judgment of Princeton
List of wineries, breweries, and distilleries in New Jersey
New Jersey Farm Winery Act
New Jersey Wine Industry Advisory Council
New Jersey wine

References

External links
Garden State Wine Growers Association
Vintage North Jersey

Wineries in New Jersey
Tourist attractions in Sussex County, New Jersey
2008 establishments in New Jersey
Hardyston Township, New Jersey